Nevus unius lateris is a cutaneous condition, an epidermal nevus in which the skin lesions are distributed on one-half of the body.

See also 
 Linear verrucous epidermal nevus

References 

Epidermal nevi, neoplasms, and cysts